Patty Stolzenbach (born 13 November 1989) is a Dutch badminton player. In 2007, she won bronze medal at the European Junior Badminton Championships in girls' singles event.

Achievements

European Junior Championships
Girls' singles

BWF International Challenge/Series
Women's singles

Women's doubles

 BWF International Challenge tournament
 BWF International Series tournament
 BWF Future Series tournament

References

External links
 

1989 births
Living people
Sportspeople from Arnhem
Dutch female badminton players
21st-century Dutch women